The 2011 Hockey East Men's Ice Hockey Tournament was played between March 11 and March 19, 2011 at campus locations and at the TD Garden in Boston, Massachusetts. The Boston College Eagles won their tenth Hockey East Tournament and earned the Hockey East's automatic bid into the 2011 NCAA Division I Men's Ice Hockey Tournament.

Format
The tournament featured three rounds of play. The teams that finish below eighth in the conference are not eligible for tournament play. In the first round, the first and eighth seeds, the second and seventh seeds, the third seed and sixth seeds, and the fourth seed and fifth seeds played a best-of-three with the winner advancing to the semifinals. In the semifinals, the highest and lowest seeds and second highest and second lowest seeds play a single-elimination game, with the winner advancing to the championship game. The tournament champion receives an automatic bid to the 2011 NCAA Division I Men's Ice Hockey Tournament.

Regular season standings
Note: GP = Games played; W = Wins; L = Losses; T = Ties; PTS = Points; GF = Goals For; GA = Goals Against

Bracket

Note: * denotes overtime periods

Quarterfinals

(1) Boston College vs. (8) Massachusetts

(2) New Hampshire vs. (7) Vermont

(3) Boston University vs. (6)Northeastern

(4) Merrimack vs. (5) Maine

Semifinals

(1) Boston College vs. (6) Northeastern

(2) New Hampshire vs. (4) Merrimack

Championship

(1) Boston College vs. (4) Merrimack

Tournament awards

All-Tournament Team
F Cam Atkinson* (Boston College)
F Ryan Flanigan (Merrimack)
F Brian Gibbons (Boston College)
D Tommy Cross (Boston College)
D Karl Stollery (Merrimack)
G John Muse (Boston College)
* Tournament MVP(s)

References

External links
2011 Hockey East Men's Ice Hockey Tournament

Hockey East Men's Ice Hockey Tournament
Hockey East Men's Ice Hockey Tournament